Beşiktaş Jimnastik Kulübü is a multi-purpose Turkish sports club, founded in 1903, in the Beşiktaş district of Istanbul. As of 2013, the club is active in 13 different branches.  The football branch of the team was formed as the club individuals gathered and begun to train together, led by Şeref Bey in 1910. Beşiktaş did not take a part of Istanbul Friday League (1904–1915) and Istanbul Sunday League (1915–1923) campaigns and started to play at competitive level of football in Istanbul League in 1923–24 season where they topped the season-end table. The club later joined Milli Küme Şampiyonası (1937–1950) and Istanbul Professional Football League (1950–1959) until the Milli Lig was formed in 1959 as the nationwide professional association football campaign.

Since 1959, Beşiktaş has competed in each and every season of the Milli Lig (1959–1962), Türkiye 1. Futbol Ligi (1962–2000) and Süper Lig (2000–present). The team has thirteen Süper Ligs, nine Turkish Cups, eight Turkish Super Cups, eight Chancellor Cups, twelve TSYD Cups, three Milli Kümes, three Turkish Federation Cups, and one Atatürk Cup as their major achievements in domestic level. In European competitions, Beşiktaş reached the quarter-finals twice, in the European Champion Clubs' Cup in 1986–87, and the UEFA Cup in 2002–03.

Below are the year-by-year final performances of Beşiktaş in domestic and international competitions.

Seasons

Timeline

References
Notes

Citations

External links
 Official website 
 Turkish Football Leagues archive on TFF 
 European Cup Records on UEFA

Seasons
Beşiktaş
Istanbul-related lists
Association football in Turkey lists